Zillah is a city in Yakima County, Washington, United States, with a population of 3,179 as of the 2020 census.

History
Zillah was founded in 1891 following the completion of the Sunnyside Canal project, an irrigation scheme delivering water from the Yakima River to the arid lower Yakima Valley. Walter Granger, superintendent of the canal company, chose the town site in 1892. The town was named for Miss Zillah Oakes, daughter of Thomas Fletcher Oakes, who, as president of the Northern Pacific Railway, had backed the building of the canal. The town was named after Miss Zillah because she would scream and cry on the way to the new town, while on the trip her father promised to name the town after her if she would stop. Granger housed the headquarters of the Washington Irrigation Company in Zillah, giving it economical advantages for a time. He also made his residency in Zillah, becoming its mayor after retiring from the irrigation company. Zillah was officially incorporated on January 5, 1911.

Geography

Demographics

2010 census
As of the census of 2010, there were 2,964 people, 1,033 households, and 741 families living in the city. The racial makeup of the city was 63.8% White, 0.3% African American, 3.8% Native American, 0.9% Asian, 0.2% Pacific Islander, 27.1% from other races, and 3.9% from two or more races. Hispanic or Latino of any race were 42.5% of the population.

There were 1,033 households, of which 43.4% had children under the age of 18 living with them, 53.0% were married couples living together, 13.1% had a female householder with no husband present, 5.6% had a male householder with no wife present, and 28.3% were non-families. 23.9% of all households were made up of individuals, and 8.9% had someone living alone who was 65 years of age or older. The average household size was 2.87 and the average family size was 3.40.

The median age in the city was 31.9 years. 31.4% of residents were under the age of 18; 8.9% were between the ages of 18 and 24; 27.3% were from 25 to 44; 22.9% were from 45 to 64; and 9.3% were 65 years of age or older. The gender makeup of the city was 49.8% male and 50.2% female.

2000 census
As of the census of 2000, there were 2,198 people, 792 households, and 591 families living in the city. The population density was 1,807.9 inhabitants per square mile (695.6/km2). There were 837 housing units at an average density of 688.4 per square mile (264.9/km2). The racial makeup of the city was 73.25% White, 0.82% African American, 2.14% Native American, 0.77% Asian, 0.36% Pacific Islander, 18.29% from other races, and 4.37% from two or more races. Hispanic or Latino of any race were 26.07% of the population.

There were 792 households, out of which 40.2% had children under the age of 18 living with them, 56.9% were married couples living together, 13.8% had a female householder with no husband present, and 25.3% were non-families. 21.7% of all households were made up of individuals, and 10.0% had someone living alone who was 65 years of age or older. The average household size was 2.78 and the average family size was 3.22.

In the city, the population was spread out, with 31.2% under the age of 18, 8.2% from 18 to 24, 27.6% from 25 to 44, 19.3% from 45 to 64, and 13.7% who were 65 and up. The median age was 33 years. For every 100 females, there were 92.0 males. For every 100 females age 18 and over, there were 89.0 males.

The median income for a household in the city was $38,214, and the median income for a family was $44,688. Males had a median income of $33,819 versus $23,603 for females. The per capita income for the city was $16,415. 13.8% of the population and 9.0% of families were below the poverty line. Out of the total population, 16.4% of those under the age of 18 and 16.6% of those 65 and older were living below the poverty line.

Schools
The Zillah School District is a small rural district of approximately 1,250 students. Its four schools are:

 Hilton Elementary School (grades K-3)
 Zillah Intermediate School (grades 4–6)
 Zillah Middle School (grades 7–8)
 Zillah High School

Zillah is one of Yakima County's smallest districts by area, at an estimated 44 square miles. It also offers an alternative school program.

Tourist attractions

 Church of God Zillah – The church was named long before the Godzilla movies began; it now officially calls itself the "Christian Worship Center".
 Teapot Dome Service Station – listed on the National Register of Historic Places.
 Several wineries.

Other churches
 Church of the Nazarene
 Faith Community Church
 Church of Jesus Christ of Latter-Day Saints
 Zillah First Baptist Church
 Grace Lutheran Church
 Valley Covenant Community Church
 Catholic Church Resurrection
 Christian Worship Center

Notable people
 R. Lee Ermey, American film, television and voice actor, and Marine drill instructor
 Sid Morrison, former member of the United States House of Representatives who resided in Zillah.

References

External links
 City of Zillah

Cities in Washington (state)
Cities in Yakima County, Washington
Populated places established in 1891
1891 establishments in Washington (state)
Populated places on the Yakima River